is the 9th single by Japanese girl group SKE48. It was the 10th best-selling single of 2012 in Japan, with 581,612 copies.

Members

"Aishite-love-ru!" 
 Team S: Masana Ōya, Yuria Kizaki, Akari Suda, Jurina Matsui, Rena Matsui, Kumi Yagami
 Team KII: Shiori Ogiso, Akane Takayanagi, Sawako Hata, Airi Furukawa, Rina Matsumoto, Manatsu Mukaida, Anna Ishida, Miki Yakata
 Team E: Shiori Kaneko, Kanon Kimoto

"Me ga Itai Kurai Hareta Sora" 
 Kenkyuusei: Narumi Ichino, Tsugumi Iwanaga, Yuuna Ego, Risa Ogino, Arisa Oowaki, Nanako Suga, Sayaka Niidol, Miki Hioki, Mizuki Fujimoto, Haruka Futamura, Nao Furuhata, Ami Miyamae, Mizuho Yamada

"Aun no Kiss" 
 Team S: Mizuki Kuwabara, Yuka Nakanishi, Rikako Hirata
 Team KII: Riho Abiru, Mieko Sato, Risako Goto
 Team E: Kyoka Isohara, Ami Kobayashi, Aya Shibata
 Kenkyuusei: Makiko Saito, Sayaka Niidoi, Kaori Matsumura

"Nante Ginga wa Arui no Darou" 
 Team S: Rena Matsui, Rumi Kato, Aki Deguchi, Yukiko Kinoshita, Shiori Takada
 Team KII: Seira Sato
 Team E: Kasumi Ueno, Madoka Umemoto, Minami Hara, Yukari Yamashita
 Kenkyuusei: Momona Kito, Nanako Suga

"Halation" 
 Team S: Aki Deguchi
 Team KII: Anna Ishida, Airi Furukawa, Tomoka Wakabayashi, Mieko Sato
 Team E: Minami Hara, Yukari Yamashita
 Kenkyuusei: Nao Furuhata

Oricon Charts

References

2012 singles
Japanese-language songs
Songs with lyrics by Yasushi Akimoto
SKE48 songs
Avex Trax singles
2012 songs